The Uruguay women's national field hockey team represents Uruguay in women's international field hockey competitions. It is controlled by the Federación Uruguaya de Hockey Sobre Césped

Tournament history

Pan American Games
2003 – 
2007 – 7th place
2015 – 5th place
2019 – 5th place

Pan American Cup
 2001 – 4th place
 2004 – 4th place
 2013 – 6th place
 2017 – 5th place
 2022 – 5th place

South American Games
2006 – 
2014 – 
2018 – 
2022 –

South American Championship
2003 – 
2008 – 
2010 – 
2013 – 
2016 –

Pan American Challenge
2011 –

Hockey World League
2012–13 – 21st place
2014–15 – 19th place
2016–17 – 23rd place

FIH Hockey Series
2018–19 – Second round

Current squad
The following 18 players represented Uruguay at the 2019 Pan American Games in Lima.

Caps and goals updated as of 9 August 2019 after the match against the Mexico.

See also
Uruguay men's national field hockey team

References

External links
Official website
FIH profile

Americas women's national field hockey teams
National
Field hockey